Failed States: The Abuse of Power and the Assault on Democracy is a book by Noam Chomsky, first published in 2006, in which Chomsky argues that the United States is becoming a "failed state", and thus a danger to its own people and the world.

See also
 Abuse of power
 Corruption in the United States

References

External links 

 
 

Books by Noam Chomsky
2006 non-fiction books
Books about democracy
Books about foreign relations of the United States
Books about politics of the United States
American political books
Metropolitan Books books
Books about political power